Sunflower Hot Springs is a geothermal mineral spring in Boise National Forest, Idaho, U.S.

Location
The springs are located at the Middle Fork of the Salmon River in the state of Idaho. This area was used by the Shoshone and Nez Perce prior to the arrival of fur trappers, miners, and later early homesteaders.

Water profile and geography
The springs have five rock pools, and part of the hot spring water cools to 102° as it cascades off a rock to create a primitive hot shower. Mineral content of the water includes calcium, potassium, magnesium, sulfate, with a pH of 8.7.

See also
 List of hot springs in the United States
 List of hot springs in the world

References

Hot springs of Idaho